Gagner is a surname. It may refer to:

Dave Gagner (born 1964), Canadian hockey player, Olympics competitor, and businessman; father of Sam Gagner
Larry Gagner (born 1943), American football player
Sam Gagner (born 1989), Canadian ice hockey player; son of Dave Gagner

See also
Gagne (surname)
Gagnon (surname)